Lauren Ilsedore Cleeves is an American astrophysicist and an assistant professor in the Department of Astronomy at the University of Virginia. She is specialized in the study of protoplanetary disks.

Career

From 2015 to 2018, Cleeves was a Hubble Fellow at the Smithsonian Astrophysical Observatory. Before that, she received her PhD from the University of Michigan under supervision of Edwin Bergin.

She is an expert in astrochemical signatures of circumstellar disks. She studies the chemistry, composition, and structure of young planetary systems in formation around low-mass stars, using theoretical modelling and observations from Atacama Large Millimeter Array and Herschel Space Observatory. She has studied the origin of water on Earth.

Awards
In 2018, Cleeves was awarded the Annie Jump Cannon Award in Astronomy "for her groundbreaking work on planet formation and protoplanetary disks".

In 2019, Cleeves was awarded a Packard Fellowship

References

Year of birth missing (living people)
Living people
University of Virginia faculty
Women astrophysicists
Women astronomers
American astrophysicists
American women scientists
Recipients of the Annie J. Cannon Award in Astronomy
University of Michigan alumni
Rice University alumni
Hubble Fellows
American women academics